Razey (also Romanized as Razei) is a city in Arshaq District of Meshgin Shahr County, Ardabil province, Iran. At the 2006 census, its population was 1,749 in 413 households. The following census in 2011 counted 1,617 people in 426 households. The latest census in 2016 showed a population of 1,581 people in 472 households.

References 

Meshgin Shahr County

Cities in Ardabil Province

Towns and villages in Meshgin Shahr County

Populated places in Ardabil Province

Populated places in Meshgin Shahr County